The Big-Belly Seahorse (Hippocampus abdominalis) or Pot-Bellied Seahorse is one of the largest seahorse species in the world, with a length of up to , and is the largest in Australia. Seahorses are members of the family Syngnathidae, and are teleost fishes.  They are found in southeast Australia and New Zealand, and are listed on Appendix II of CITES.

Habitat 
The big-belly seahorse is found among algae, seagrasses, and rocky reefs in shallow water, and attached to sponges and colonial hydroids in deeper areas. They also attach to jetty piles and other manmade objects, and can be found in estuaries. Juveniles are pelagic or attached to drifting seaweed.

Description 

The big-belly seahorse has a forward-tilted, a long-snouted head, a distended but narrow pot belly, and a long, coiled tail. It swims using its dorsal fin with a vertical stance; when not swimming, it coils its prehensile tail around any suitable growth, such as seaweed, waiting for planktonic animals to drift by, when they are sucked up by the small mouth set at the tip of the snout much like a vacuum cleaner. Seahorses are voracious feeders, eating mainly crustaceans, such as shrimp, and other small animals living among the seaweed, such as copepods and amphipods. They do not chew, so they can eat to excess because of their small gut tract.  Each eye moves separately, making it easier for them to see food and predators.

Distinguishing males from females is easy: The male has a smooth, soft, pouch-like area at the base of its abdomen where the stomach meets the tail on the front side. Males also have a fin there, but it is less obvious. The female has more of a pointed stomach with a very obvious fin at the base of it.

Reproduction 
In the wild, breeding can commence when the seahorses are about one year old, and this can be reduced to about eight months when in captivity. Breeding in big-belly seahorses year-round, with peaks in the warmer months.

Courtship initiation involves a series of colour changes and postural displays. Dilating the opening of the brood pouch slightly, the male inflates the pouch to balloon-like proportions with water by swimming forwards, or by pushing his body forwards in a pumping action, then closing the pouch opening. At the same time, he lightens his pouch in colour to white or light yellow. The male also brightens his overall body colouration, typically intensifying the yellow. A male repeatedly approaches his selected female with his head tucked down, and dorsal and pectoral fins rapidly fluttering.

If the female is not receptive, she ignores the male, which then looks for another potential mate. If no females are receptive, the male stops displaying and deflates the pouch by dilating the pouch opening and bending forwards, expelling the water inside. If a female is receptive to a courting male, she reciprocates with her own color changes and head tucking, typically intensifying the lighter colours such as yellow and white, highlighting the contrast between these colours and her overall darker blotching and banding patterning. A series of short bursts of swimming together in tandem then ensues, sometimes with tails entwined, or with the female tightly rolling her tail up. This has often been described as 'dancing'. After coming to rest, the male attempts to get the female to swim towards the water surface with him by repeatedly pointing his snout upwards.

If the female responds by also pointing her snout upwards, then the final stage of courtship follows. This involves both the male and female swimming directly upwards towards the water surface with both their heads pointing upwards and tails pointing straight down. If they reach the water surface, one or both seahorses can often be seen and heard to snap their heads. To transfer her eggs to the male, the female faces the male, slightly above him. Pressing the base of her abdomen against the male's pouch, she then squirts her eggs through the opening in the front of his dilated pouch.

The male seahorse brood 300–700 young at a time, and can have up to four broods in summer. Their colouring is a variable shade of brown, mottled with yellow-brown and with darker splotches. The tail is often circled with yellow bands. In deeper water where the tail is anchored to other colourful forms of life, such as sponges and hydroids, they often take on these colours.

Aquaculture 
The big-belly seahorse is a popular aquarium species and dried specimens are sold as traditional medicine in Asia. Stocks come from the wild or are aquarium-reared.  They are easy to keep in aquariums and feed on small shrimp and crustaceans.

References 

 A. B. Wilson and K. M. Martin-Smith (2007) Genetic monogamy despite social promiscuity in the pot-bellied seahorse (Hippocampus abdominalis), Molecular Ecology, 16, 2345–2352.
 
 Tony Ayling & Geoffrey Cox, Collins Guide to the Sea Fishes of New Zealand, (William Collins Publishers Ltd, Auckland, New Zealand 1982) 
 Chris M. C. Woods, National Institute of Water and Atmospheric Research, Received 16 July 2002; received in revised form 16 October 2002; accepted 14 November 2002 pp. 538. Effects of varying Artemia enrichment on growth and survival of juvenile seahorses, Hippocampus abdominalis. (Aquaculture 220 (2003)).
 Chris M. C. WOODS, New Zealand Journal of Marine and Freshwater Research, 2000, Vol. 34 pp. 475–485.  Preliminary observations on breeding and rearing the seahorse Hippocampus abdominalis (Teleostei: Syngnathidae) in captivity. (The Royal Society of New Zealand 2000).
 Chris M. C. Woods, New Zealand Journal of Marine and Freshwater Research, 2002, Vol. 36: 655–660. Natural diet of the seahorse Hippocampus abdominalis. The Royal Society of New Zealand 2002
 Chris M. C. Woods, New Zealand Journal of Marine and Freshwater Research, 2005, Vol. 39: 881–888 Reproductive output of male seahorses, Hippocampus abdominalis, from Wellington Harbour, New Zealand: implications for conservation. (The Royal Society of New Zealand 2005).
 Chris M. C. Woods, National Institute of Water and Atmospheric Research, Received 17 December 1999; received in revised form 2 May 2000; accepted 9 May 2000. pp 377–388. Improving initial survival in cultured seahorses, Hippocampus abdominalis Leeson, 1827 (Teleostei: Syngnathidae) (Aquaculture 190, 2000).
 Chris M. C. Woods & FiammaValentino, National Institute of Water and Atmospheric Research,Wellington, New Zealand. Naples Zoological Station‘A. Dohrn’,Villa Comunale1, Naples, Italy. Frozen mysids as an alternative to live Artemia in culturing seahorses Hippocampus abdominalis (Aquaculture Research, 2003 34, 757-763).
 Gay, P. (2002, October 18). About seahorses. Southland Times, The. Retrieved March 12, 2008, from Australia/New Zealand Reference Centre database.
 Hutchings, C. (1997, January). Secret life of seahorses. Geographical, 69(1), 31. Retrieved March 12, 2008, from Academic Search Premier database.
 Schleichert, E. (2000, May). Seahorses. Ranger Rick, 34(5), 30. Retrieved March 12, 2008, from MAS Ultra – School Edition database.
 Steeman, M. (2001, December 5). Plan to export seahorses to Asia. Dominion Post, The. Retrieved March 12, 2008, from Australia/New Zealand Reference Centre database.

External links 

 Pot-bellied seahorse discussed on RNZ Critter of the Week, 9 December 2022

 New Zealand Pot Bellied Sea Horse
 Care sheet for Hippocampus Abdominalis in Aquariums
 Seahorse.com
 Hippocampus_Abdominalis_Video
 Playful Hippocampus Abdominalis Video

big-belly seahorse
Marine fish of Southern Australia
Marine fish of Tasmania
Marine fish of New Zealand
Taxa named by René Lesson
big-belly seahorse
Articles containing video clips